Ernst Olov Bolldén (28 September 1966 – 30 April 2012) was a Swedish wheelchair table tennis player. He represented Sweden at every Summer Paralympics from 1988 to 2004 and won medals for para table tennis. He was on the gold-winning Swedish team at the 1996 Atlanta Paralympics and won a bronze in men's singles at that same Games. He won another bronze in the men's team event at the 2000 Sydney Paralympics.

Bolldén was born in Njutånger, Sweden. He had a twin brother and two older brothers. Bolldén became paralysed from the waist and down in a schoolyard accident in Iggesund in 1979.

In July 2011, he was diagnosed with invasive bladder cancer. Bolldén died on 30 April 2012. He was 45.

Career records

Olympic Games
1996: Olympic gold in team wheelchair 
1996: OS bronze in single wheelchair 
2000: OS bronze in team wheelchair

World Championship
1986: World Cup silver in single wheelchair 
1986: World Cup silver in team wheelchair 
1990: World Cup Gold in single wheelchair 
1990: World Cup Bronze in Team Wheelchair 
1998: World Cup silver in team wheelchair 
1998: World Cup bronze in single wheelchair 
2002: WM-silver in team wheelchair 
2002: WM silver in single wheelchair 
2006: WM gold in single wheelchair

European Championships
1991: Euro gold in single wheelchair 
1995: Euro gold in single wheelchair 
1995: EM-silver in layers of wheelchair 
1997: Euro gold in single wheelchair 
1999: EM bronze in open wheelchair class 
2003: EM bronze in single wheelchair 
2003: EM bronze in team wheelchair 
2009: EM bronze in single wheelchair 
2009: EM-silver in layers of wheelchair

Other credits
Nominated for the award for the year's athletes with disabilities to the Swedish Athletics 2007. 
2006: Elected best player or World Championships in wheelchair men category.

References

External links 
Ernst Bolldén's official site

1966 births
2012 deaths
Swedish male table tennis players
Table tennis players at the 1988 Summer Paralympics
Table tennis players at the 1992 Summer Paralympics
Table tennis players at the 1996 Summer Paralympics
Table tennis players at the 2000 Summer Paralympics
Table tennis players at the 2004 Summer Paralympics
Paralympic table tennis players of Sweden
Medalists at the 1996 Summer Paralympics
Medalists at the 2000 Summer Paralympics
Paralympic medalists in table tennis
Paralympic gold medalists for Sweden
Paralympic bronze medalists for Sweden
Deaths from cancer in Sweden
Deaths from bladder cancer
Swedish twins
Twin sportspeople